The Senior women's race at the 1988 IAAF World Cross Country Championships was held in Auckland, New Zealand at the Ellerslie Racecourse on March 26, 1988. A report on the event was given in the Glasgow Herald. Complete results, medallists, 
 and the results of British athletes were published.

Race results

Senior women's race (5.962 km)

Individual

Teams

Note: Athletes in parentheses did not score for the team result

Participation
An unofficial count yields the participation of 141 athletes from 32 countries in the Senior women's race.  This is in agreement with the official numbers as published.

 (4)
 (6)
 (1)
 (4)
 (5)
 (5)
 (4)
 (3)
 (4)
 (4)
 (6)
 (4)
 (4)
 (6)
 (6)
 (6)
 (6)
 (1)
 (1)
 (4)
 (6)
 (6)
 (2)
 (5)
 (6)
 (6)
 (2)
 (4)
 (6)
 (6)
 (4)
 (4)

See also
 1988 IAAF World Cross Country Championships – Senior men's race
 1988 IAAF World Cross Country Championships – Junior men's race

References

Senior women's race at the World Athletics Cross Country Championships
IAAF World Cross Country Championships
1988 in women's athletics